1623 in philosophy

Events 
 Galileo Galilei lays down the foundations of the scientific method.

Publications 
 Francis Bacon, De Augmentis Scientiarum (1623)
 Galileo Galilei, The Assayer (Il Saggiatore) (1623)
 Patrick Scot, The Tillage of Light (1623)

Births 
 May 26 - William Petty (died 1687)
 June 19 - Blaise Pascal (died 1662)

Deaths 
 16 November - Francisco Sanches (born 1550)

References

Bibliography 
 Arnǎutu, Robert R. A., Early Modern Philosophy of Technology: Bacon and Descartes, Zeta Books, 2017 .
 Debus, Allen G., The Chemical Philosophy, Courier Corporation, 2013 .
 Drake, Stillman, Essays on Galileo and the History and Philosophy of Science, University of Toronto Press, 1999 .
 Galileo Galilei, (trans: Stillman Drake), The Assayer, 1623
 McClellan, James Edward; Dorn, Harold, Science and Technology in World History, Johns Hopkins University Press, 2006 .

Philosophy
Early Modern philosophy
Philosophy by year